Oldboy is a 2003 South Korean neo-noir mystery thriller film directed and co-written by Park Chan-wook. A loose adaptation of the Japanese manga of the same name, the film follows the story of Oh Dae-su (Choi Min-sik), who is imprisoned in a cell which resembles a hotel room for 15 years without knowing the identity of his captor nor his captor's motives. When he is finally released, Dae-su finds himself still trapped in a web of conspiracy and violence. His own quest for vengeance becomes tied in with romance when he falls in love with an attractive young sushi chef, Mi-do (Kang Hye-jung).

The film won the Grand Prix at the 2004 Cannes Film Festival and high praise from the president of the jury, director Quentin Tarantino. The film has received widespread acclaim in the United States, with film critic Roger Ebert stating that Oldboy is a "powerful film not because of what it depicts, but because of the depths of the human heart which it strips bare". It also received praise for its action sequences, most notably the single shot corridor fight sequence.

It has been regarded as one of the best films of all time and listed among the best films of the 2000s in several publications. The film has had two remakes, an unauthorised 2006 Hindi film and a 2013 American film. The film is the second installment of Park's The Vengeance Trilogy, preceded by Sympathy for Mr. Vengeance (2002) and followed by Lady Vengeance (2005).

Plot

In 1988, businessman Oh Dae-su is arrested for drunkenness, missing his daughter's fourth birthday. After his friend Joo-hwan picks him up from the police station, Dae-su is kidnapped and wakes up in a sealed hotel room, where food is delivered through a pet door. Dae-su learns that his wife has been murdered and that he has been framed as a prime suspect by his captors. As years of imprisonment pass, Dae-su hallucinates, grows deranged from solitude, and eventually attempts suicide. While unconscious after slashing his wrists, Dae-su is resuscitated and bandaged, prevented from dying in order to ensure that he continues to live in agony. After this, Dae-su passes the time practicing shadowboxing and attempting to dig an escape tunnel in order to seek vengeance against his captors.

In 2003, Dae-su is suddenly released after being sedated and hypnotized. Dae-su wakes up and, after testing his fighting skills on a group of thugs, a mysterious beggar gives him money and a cell phone. Dae-su enters a sushi restaurant where he meets Mi-do, a young chef. He receives a taunting phone call from his captor, collapses, and is taken in by Mi-do. Dae-su attempts to leave Mi-do's apartment, but Mi-do, now interested in Dae-su, stops him. They reconcile and begin to form a bond. After he recovers, Dae-su attempts to find his daughter, but gives up on trying to contact her after learning she was adopted after his kidnapping. Now focused on identifying his captors, Dae-su locates the Chinese restaurant that made his prison food and finds the prison by following a deliveryman. 

Dae-su learns the hotel he was held in is a private prison, where people pay to have others incarcerated. He tortures and interrogates the warden, Mr. Park Cheol-woong, who divulges that Dae-su was imprisoned for "talking too much". Mr. Park's guards come to attack Dae-su, and they fight fiercely in the hotel corridor; Dae-su is stabbed but manages to defeat all of them. Dae-su's captor is revealed to be a wealthy businessman named Lee Woo-jin. Woo-jin gives him an ultimatum: if Dae-su can uncover the motive for his imprisonment within five days, Woo-jin will kill himself; otherwise, he will kill Mi-do. Dae-su and Mi-do get close and have sex. Meanwhile, Joo-hwan tries to contact Dae-su with important information, but is murdered by Woo-jin. Dae-su eventually recalls that he and Woo-jin went to the same high school, and that he witnessed Woo-jin committing incest with his own sister. Dae-su told Joo-hwan what he saw, which led to his classmates gossiping about it. Rumors spread and Woo-jin's sister committed suicide, leading a grief-stricken Woo-jin to seek revenge. In the present, Woo-jin cuts off Mr. Park's hand, leading Mr. Park and his gang to join forces with Dae-su. Dae-su leaves Mi-do with Mr. Park and sets out to face Woo-jin. 

At Woo-jin's penthouse, he shows Dae-su a purple box containing a family album containing photos of Dae-su, his wife, and his infant daughter together from years ago, progressing to show how his daughter grew up. Woo-jin then reveals that Mi-do is actually Dae-su's daughter, and that he had orchestrated everything, using hypnosis to guide Dae-su to the restaurant so he and Mi-do would fall in love, so that Dae-su would experience the same pain of incest that he did. Woo-jin reveals that Mr. Park is still working for him and threatens to tell the truth to Mi-do. Dae-su apologizes for being the source of the rumor that caused the death of Woo-jin's sister, and humiliates himself by imitating a dog and begging. When Woo-jin is unimpressed, Dae-su cuts out his own tongue as a sign of penance. Woo-jin finally accepts Dae-su's apology and tells Mr. Park to hide the truth from Mi-do. He then drops the device he claims is the remote to his pacemaker and walks away. Dae-su activates the device in an attempt to kill Woo-jin, only to find it is actually a remote for loudspeakers, which play an audio recording of Dae-su and Mi-do having sex. As Dae-su collapses in despair, Woo-jin enters the elevator, where he recalls his sister's suicide and kills himself by handgun.

Some time later, Dae-su finds the hypnotist and asks her to erase his knowledge of Mi-do being his daughter so that they can stay happy together. To persuade her, he repeats the question he heard from the man on the rooftop, and the hypnotist agrees. Afterward, Mi-do finds Dae-su lying in snow, but there are no signs of the hypnotist. Mi-do confesses her love for him and the two embrace. Dae-su breaks into a wide smile, which is slowly replaced by a more ambiguous expression.

Cast 

 Choi Min-sik as Oh Dae-su, a businessman who seeks revenge after being held in a mysterious prison for 15 years. Choi Min-sik lost and gained weight for his role depending on the filming schedule, trained for six weeks, and did most of his own stunt work.
 Oh Tae-kyung as young Dae-su
 Yoo Ji-tae as Lee Woo-jin, the man behind Oh Dae-su's imprisonment. Park Chan-wook's ideal choice for Woo-jin had been actor Han Suk-kyu, who previously played a rival to Choi Min-sik in Shiri and No. 3. Choi then suggested Yoo Ji-tae for the role, despite Park believing he was too young for the part.
 Yoo Yeon-seok as young Woo-jin
 Kang Hye-jung as Mi-do, Dae-su's love interest.
 Ji Dae-han as No Joo-hwan, Dae-su's friend and the owner of an internet café.
 Woo Il-han as young Joo-hwan 
 Kim Byeong-ok as Mr. Han, Woo-jin's bodyguard.
 Yoon Jin-seo as Lee Soo-ah, Woo-jin's sister.
 Oh Dal-su as Park Cheol-woong, the private prison's warden.

Production 

The corridor fight scene took seventeen takes in three days to perfect and was one continuous take; there was no editing of any sort except for the knife that was stabbed in Oh Dae-su's back, which was computer-generated imagery.

The script originally called for full male frontal nudity, but Yoo Ji-tae changed his mind after the scenes had been shot.

Other computer-generated imagery in the film includes the ant coming out of Dae-su's arm (according to the making-of feature on the DVD, the whole arm was CGI) and the ants crawling over him afterwards. The octopus being eaten alive was not computer-generated; four were used during the filming of this scene. Actor Choi Min-sik, a Buddhist, said a prayer for each one. The eating of squirming octopuses (called san-nakji (산낙지) in Korean) as a delicacy exists in East Asia, although it is usually killed and cut, not eaten whole and alive; the squirming is a result of posthumous nerve activity in the octopus' tentacles. When asked in DVD commentary if he felt sorry for Choi, director Park Chan-wook stated he felt more sorry for the octopus.

The final scene's snowy landscape was filmed in New Zealand. The ending is deliberately ambiguous, and the audience is left with several questions: specifically, how much time has passed, if Dae-su's meeting with the hypnotist really took place, whether he successfully lost the knowledge of Mi-do's identity, and whether he will continue his relationship with Mi-do. In an interview with Park (included with the European release of the film), he says that the ambiguous ending was deliberate and intended to generate discussion; it is completely up to each individual viewer to interpret what isn't shown.

Reception and analysis

Critical response 
Oldboy received generally positive reviews from critics. Review aggregation website Rotten Tomatoes gives the film a score of 81% based on 151 reviews with an average rating of 7.40/10. The site's consensus is "Violent and definitely not for the squeamish, Park Chan-Wook's visceral Oldboy is a strange, powerful tale of revenge." Metacritic gives the film an average score of 77 out of 100, based on 32 reviews.

Roger Ebert of the Chicago Sun-Times gave the film four out of four stars. Ebert remarked: "We are so accustomed to 'thrillers' that exist only as machines for creating diversion that it's a shock to find a movie in which the action, however violent, makes a statement and has a purpose." James Berardinelli of ReelViews gave the film three out of four stars, saying that it "isn't for everyone, but it offers a breath of fresh air to anyone gasping on the fumes of too many traditional Hollywood thrillers."

Stephanie Zacharek of Salon.com praised the film, calling it "anguished, beautiful, and desperately alive" and "a dazzling work of pop-culture artistry." Peter Bradshaw gave it 5/5 stars, commenting that this is the first time in which he could actually identify with a small live octopus. Bradshaw summarizes his review by referring to Oldboy as "cinema that holds an edge of cold steel to your throat." David Dylan Thomas points out that rather than simply trying to "gross us out", Oldboy is "much more interested in playing with the conventions of the revenge fantasy and taking us on a very entertaining ride to places that, conceptually, we might not want to go." Sean Axmaker of the Seattle Post-Intelligencer gave Oldboy a score of "B−", calling it "a bloody and brutal revenge film immersed in madness and directed with operatic intensity," but felt that the questions raised by the film are "lost in the battering assault of lovingly crafted brutality."

MovieGazette lists 10 features on its "It's Got" list for Oldboy and summarizes its review of Oldboy by saying, "Forget ‘The Punisher’ and ‘Man on Fire’ – this mesmerising revenger's tragicomedy shows just how far-reaching the tentacles of mad vengeance can be." MovieGazette also comments that it "needs to be seen to be believed." Jamie Russell of the BBC movie review calls it a "sadistic masterpiece that confirms Korea's current status as producer of some of the world's most exciting cinema." In 2019 on The Hankyoreh, Kim Hyeong-seok said that Oldboy was the 'zeitgeist of the vigorous Korean cinema in early 2000s', and a 'boiling point that led history of Korean cinema to new state'. Manohla Dargis of the New York Times gave a lukewarm review, saying that "there is not much to think about here, outside of the choreographed mayhem." J.R. Jones of the Chicago Reader was also not impressed, saying that "there's a lot less here than meets the eye."

In 2008, Oldboy was placed 64th on an Empire list of the top 500 movies of all time. The same year, voters on CNN named it one of the ten best Asian films ever made. It was ranked #18 in the same magazine's "The 100 Best Films of World Cinema" in 2010. In a 2016 BBC poll, critics voted the film the 30th greatest since 2000. In 2020, The Guardian ranked it number 3 among the classics of modern South Korean Cinema.

Oedipus the King inspiration 

Park Chan-wook stated that he named the main character Oh Dae-su "to remind the viewer of Oedipus." In one of the film's iconic shots, Yoo Ji-tae, who played Woo-jin, strikes an extraordinary yoga pose. Park Chan-wook said he designed this pose to convey "the image of Apollo." It was Apollo's prophecy that revealed Oedipus' fate in Sophocles' Oedipus the King. The link to Oedipus Rex is only a minor element in most English-language criticism of the movie, while Koreans have made it a central theme. Sung Hee Kim wrote "Family seen through Greek tragedy and Korean movie – Oedipus the King and Old Boy." Kim Kyungae offers a different analysis, with Dae-su and Woo-jin both representing Oedipus. Besides the theme of unknown incest revealed, Oedipus gouges his eyes out to avoid seeing a world that despises the truth, while Oh Dae-su cuts off his tongue to avoid revealing the truth to his world.

More parallels with Greek tragedy include the fact that Lee Woo-jin looks relatively young as compared to Oh Dae-su when they are supposed to be contemporaries at school, which makes Lee Woo-jin look like an immortal Greek god whereas Oh Dae-su is merely an aged mortal. Indeed, throughout the movie Lee Woo-jin is portrayed as an obscenely rich young man who lives in a lofty tower and is omnipresent due to having planted listening devices on Oh Dae-Su and others, which again furthers the parallel between his character and the secrecy of Greek gods.

Mido, who throughout the movie comes across as a strong-willed, young and innocent girl, which is not too far from Sophocles' Antigone, Oedipus' daughter, who, though she does not commit incest with her father, remains faithful and loyal to him which reminds us of the bittersweet ending where Mido reunites with Oh Dae-Su and takes care of him in the wilderness (cf. Oedipus at Colonus, another Sophocles play about Oedipus). Another interesting character is the hypnotist, who, apart from being able to hypnotise people, also has the power to make people fall in love (e.g. Dae-Su and Mido), which is characteristic of the power of Aphrodite, the goddess of love, whose classic act is to make Paris and Helen fall in love before and during the Trojan War.

Box office performance 
 
In South Korea, the film was seen by 3,260,000 filmgoers and ranks fifth for the highest-grossing film of 2003.

It grossed a total of US$14,980,005 worldwide.

Home media 
In the United Kingdom, the film was watched by 300,000 television viewers on Channel 4 in 2011. This made it the year's most-watched foreign-language film on a non-BBC television channel in the UK.

Awards and nominations

Soundtrack 

Nearly all the music cues that are composed by Shim Hyeon-jeong, Lee Ji-soo and Choi Seung-hyun are titled after films, many of them film noirs.

 Track listing

Remakes

Controversy over Zinda 
Zinda, the Bollywood film directed by writer-director Sanjay Gupta, also bears a striking resemblance to Oldboy but is not an officially sanctioned remake. It was reported in 2005 that Zinda was under investigation for violation of copyright. A spokesman for Show East, the distributor of Oldboy, said, "If we find out there's indeed a strong similarity between the two, it looks like we'll have to talk with our lawyers." Show East, the producers of Oldboy, who had already sold the film's rights to DreamWorks in 2004, initially expressed legal concerns but no legal action was taken as the studio had shut down.

American film remake 
Steven Spielberg originally intended to make a version of the movie starring Will Smith in 2008. He commissioned screenwriter Mark Protosevich to work on the adaptation. Spielberg pulled out of the project in 2009. An American remake directed by Spike Lee was released on 27 November 2013. The remake generally received negative reviews with a 39 percent on Rotten Tomatoes.

See also 
 East Asian cinema
 Greek tragedy
 Kafkaesque
 List of Korean-language films
 List of South Korean films of 2003
 Revenge play
 List of cult films

References

External links 

 
 
 
 
 
 
 

2003 films
2000s Korean-language films
2003 action thriller films
2000s mystery films
Films about kidnapping
South Korean films about revenge
Films about suicide
Films directed by Park Chan-wook
Films about hypnosis
Films set in 1988
Films set in 2003
Films shot in Busan
Films shot in New Zealand
Films shot in Seoul
Incest in film
Live-action films based on manga
South Korean neo-noir films
South Korean nonlinear narrative films
South Korean action thriller films
South Korean mystery thriller films
South Korean films remade in other languages
South Korean crime thriller films
Cannes Grand Prix winners
South Korean independent films
2000s South Korean films
CJ Entertainment films